Dudley Marlon Von Hagt (born 31 March 1965) is a former Sri Lankan cricketer who played one One Day International in 1985. He currently lives in Victoria, Australia.

International career
Von Hagt was part of the Sri Lanka squad that toured England in 1984. He was the 12th man for the one-off test at Lord's.
He Represented Sri Lanka in an ODI of the Benson & Hedges World Series Cup in February 1985 vs. Australia at Perth.
But appearances thereafter were limited - he all but stopped playing after 1986, returning for three matches for Moors Sports Club in 1988–89 with some success.

In February 2020, he was named in Sri Lanka's squad for the Over-50s Cricket World Cup in South Africa. However, the tournament was cancelled during the third round of matches due to the coronavirus pandemic.

Personal life
Von Hagt attended St. Anthony's College, Kandy. He is a cousin of former Sri Lanka captain Marvan Atapattu

References

External links

1965 births
Living people
Sri Lankan cricketers
Sri Lanka One Day International cricketers
Alumni of St. Anthony's College, Kandy
Moors Sports Club cricketers
Sri Lankan emigrants to Australia